Elche Club de Fútbol, S.A.D. is a professional football based in Elche, Province of Alicante, in the Valencian Community. Founded in 1923, the club competes in La Liga, holding home matches at Estadio Manuel Martínez Valero, with a capacity of 33,732 seats.

Founded in 1923 as the result of a merger between all of the town's clubs, Elche entered the league system in 1929, reaching Segunda División in 1934 and La Liga in 1959, finishing fifth in the latter tournament in 1963–64. The club were runners-up in the Copa del Rey in 1969. Elche became the first and only club in the history of La Liga to be relegated due to unpaid tax debts in the 2014–15 season. Elche returned to La Liga in 2020–21 after being promoted to the Segunda División and then La Liga in only three seasons.

History

Foundation and early years
Elche Club de Fútbol was founded in the winter of 1923, after the merger of all of the town's football teams. The club's first-ever game was against Monóvar, where they beat the home team 4–0, and its first official match was a 2–0 win over Crevillente. In its first years Elche, like many teams of the time, played in an all white uniform. The team played its first league season in 1929–30, in the Tercera División, achieving promotion to the Segunda División in 1934. However, Elche suffered relegation for the first time six years later, but were promoted back the following season.

In the late 1950s, Elche achieved two consecutive promotions from the third level to La Liga, securing the club's first promotion to the latter competition with a 3–0 success against Tenerife in 1959.

1959–78: La Liga

Elche opened its first season in the top level with a 1–1 draw against Real Oviedo, the first goal being scored by Vicente Pahuet. The club finished tenth out of 16 sides, nine points ahead of relegated Osasuna – the campaign included a 2–1 comeback home victory over Barcelona, but also a 2–11 loss at Real Madrid. The following season saw the team having to compete in the relegation/promotion play-off, where it overcame a 0–1 loss in the away leg against Atlético Ceuta with a 4–0 home victory.

Elche achieved their best-ever league finish in 1963–64, ranking in fifth position. The season also saw the club's reserve team, Elche Ilicitano, promote to Segunda División.

In 1969 the club reached their first and only Copa del Rey final, following victories over Pontevedra, Valencia and Real Sociedad. The semi-final against the latter was won 2–0 in a replay in neutral Madrid, as the tie had finished 4–4 on aggregate; the final, played on June 15 at the Santiago Bernabéu Stadium in the same city, brought a 0–1 loss to Athletic Bilbao.

After twelve seasons Elche were relegated to division two in 1971, having finished second from bottom. Two years later the team returned to the main category, as champions. Its second spell in the top flight lasted five seasons, often immerse in relegation fights as the best campaign (1974–75) ended with the club in eighth position; at the end of 1977–78 the side returned to the second division after finishing 17th out of 18 clubs, the last game being a 4–4 draw with Atlético Madrid, which was led 2–4 with five minutes remaining.

80s and 90s: severe financial crisis

After the relegation in 1978 Elche suffered. Although on paper they had a good team they never managed to gain promotion to the top flight – in fact, in the first five years since their return to the second level, they were fourth on three occasions and fifth on two (and on a further two, even on points with the third-placed team but with a worse goal difference), often losing the chance of promotion on the last matchday. Especially traumatic was the finish of the 1980–81 season: with one game remaining, they were second two points ahead of Rayo Vallecano and Racing de Santander, only needing a draw against Cádiz at the Martínez Valero; the game ended however in a loss, and Elche finished with 45 points alongside Castellón, Cádiz, Racing and Rayo.

A promotion finally occurred at the end of 1983–84, even though Elche only finished fifth in the regular season – the first two positions were occupied by Real Madrid Castilla and Athletic Bilbao B, who could not promote as reserve sides. The whole of the top division campaign was spent in the relegation zone, and relegation consequently befell as 17th. In 1988 they were promoted again for another cameo appearance, as the side went on to finish dead last with eighteen points, dropping down a category alongside Real Murcia, who they trailed by nine points; the last match for years in the category was a 1–3 away loss against Real Zaragoza, the goal coming courtesy of Alfonso Fernández.

After the relegation in 1989, Elche started to suffer heavily in the financial department, and relegated to Segunda División B – the new third level created in 1977 – at the end of 1990–91. During the better part of the 1990s the club reached the second division promotion playoffs, only to consecutively fall short.

In 1997 Elche finally managed to return to the second category, being immediately relegated back but gaining another promotion subsequently.

2010s: return to the top flight

In 2010–11, again in the "silver category", the team finished fourth and thus qualified for the play-offs: after disposing of Real Valladolid in the first round (3–2 on aggregate) the dream of top flight promotion ended at the hands of Granada, on the away goals rule.

On May 18, 2013, following Barcelona B and Alcorcón's 1–1 draw, Elche was automatically promoted to the top level, returning to the competition after 24 years. In the meantime the team coached by Fran Escribá had broken a number of Segunda División records, being the only team to date able to lead the competition from the first until the last match of the season, setting in the process a new record of both matches won and points scored to date as well as the best first round in the history of Segunda's championship.

During the 2013–14 season, the team managed to keep in the top competition, with an average attendance to home matches estimated at 25,104 people.

In the 2014–15 season, despite managing once again to keep in the top flight (the team was already safe from relegation four dates before the end of the competition) Elche became the first team ever in the history of the Spanish Primera División being relegated to Segunda following new regulations by the Spanish football league limiting excess debt and economic mismanagement.

In the 2016–17 season, Elche were relegated to third level after 18 years in professional league.

One year later, Elche promoted back to second level after defeating Villarreal B in the final play-off promotion to second level.

In the 2018–19 season, Elche finished right in the middle, on 11th place among 22 teams.

In the 2019–20 season, Elche were promoted to La Liga by beating Girona in the promotion play-off final 1–0 on aggregate. They were promoted back to La Liga after five years in the second and third divisions.

Seasons

Season to season
As Elche Football Club

As Elche Club de Fútbol

24 seasons in La Liga
39 seasons in Segunda División
8 seasons in Segunda División B
19 seasons in Tercera División

Current squad
.

Reserve team

Out on loan

Coaching staff

   Jose Ortega

   Manuel Sempere   Fidel
   Óscar Suarez
   Dr. Paulino Vázquez

   Carlos Valero   Sergio Tur

   Béranger

Honours
Segunda División
Winners: 1958–59, 2012–13
Copa del Rey
Runners-up: 1969

International players

 Marc Bernaus
 Juan Carlos Heredia
 Marcelo Trobbiani
 Willy Caballero
 Fernand Goyvaerts
 Garry Rodrigues
 Enzo Roco
 Dominique Malonga
 Mario Pašalić
 Tommy Christensen
 Nicki Bille Nielsen
 Rodolfo Bodipo
 Iván Bolado
 Richmond Boakye
 Wakaso
 Sory Kaba
 José Cardona
 Gilberto Yearwood
 Balázs Molnár
 Moha
 Benedict Iroha
 Francis Uzoho
 Jan Berg
 Roberto Acuña
 Florencio Amarilla
 José Aveiro
 Juan Casco
 Ramón Hicks
 Juan Carlos Lezcano
 Cayetano Ré
 Derlis Soto
 Germán Leguía
 Juan Carlos Oblitas
 Tomasz Frankowski
 Antoni Łukasiewicz
 Przemysław Tytoń
 Silas
 Ioan Andone
 Cristian Săpunaru
 Dennis Şerban
 Albert Nadj
 Saša Petrović
 Juan Manuel Asensi
 Rubén Cano
 Chancho 
 Fidel
 Gonzalo Verdú
 Josan
 Carlos Muñoz
 Javi Navarro
 Nino
 Jorge Otero
 Marcial Pina
 César Rodríguez
 Hilario
  Eulogio Martínez
 Fabián Coelho
 Dagoberto Moll
 Mario Saralegui
 Tabaré Silva
 Juan Carlos Socorro
 Andrés Túñez
 Goran Đorović
 Carlos Sánchez

Coaches

 César (1959 – June 30, 1960)
 Antonio Barrios (July 1, 1960 – February 6, 1961)
 Otto Bumbel (1962–63)
 Heriberto Herrera (July 1, 1963 – June 30, 1964)
 Rosendo Hernández (1964)
 Martim Francisco (1964–65)
 Otto Bumbel (1965–67)
  Alfredo Di Stéfano (July 1, 1967 – January 8, 1968)
 Ferdinand Daučík (1968)
 Roque Máspoli (July 1, 1968 – December 31, 1969)
 Salvador Artigas (1970)
 Otto Bumbel (1970–71)
 Roque Olsen (1971–74)
 Néstor Rossi (1974–75)
 Marcel Domingo (1975–76)
 Felipe Mesones (1976–77)
 Roque Olsen (1977–78)
 Heriberto Herrera (July 1, 1978 – June 30, 1979)
 Arsenio Iglesias (1979–80)
 Héctor Rial (1980)
 Felipe Mesones (1981–82)
 Luis Cid (1982–83)
 Cayetano Ré (1983–84)
 Antonio Ruiz (1984)
 Roque Olsen (1984–85)
 Delfín Álvarez (1986–87)
 Felipe Mesones (1987–88)
   László Kubala (1988–89)
 Luis Costa (1989)
 Tomeu Llompart (1991–92)
 Julián Rubio (July 1, 1993 – June 30, 1994)
 Quique Hernández (July 19, 1994 – June 30, 1995)
 Felipe Mesones (1995–96)
 Fabri (1996)
 Marcial (1996–97)
 Ciriaco Cano (1997–98)
 Delfín Álvarez (1997–98)
 Jorge D'Alessandro (January 25, 2000 – June 30, 2000)
 Felipe Mesones (2000)
 Marcial (2000)
 Jorge D'Alessandro (December 21, 2000 – April 16, 2001)
 Marcial (2001)
 Julián Rubio (July 1, 2001 – June 30, 2003)
 Carlos García Cantarero (2003)
 Oscar Ruggeri (December 22, 2003 – May 16, 2004)
 Josu Uribe (2004–06)
 Julián Rubio (2006)
 Luis García (July 1, 2006 – June 30, 2007)
 David Vidal (January 12, 2007 – October 12, 2008)
 Claudio Barragán (October 12, 2008 – October 4, 2009)
 José Bordalás (October 5, 2009 – April 8, 2012)
 César Ferrando (April 10, 2012 – June 30, 2012)
 Fran Escribá (July 1, 2012 – June 26, 2015)
 Rubén Baraja (July 12, 2015 – June 6, 2016)
 Lucas Alcaraz (June 11, 2016 – June 17, 2016)
 Alberto Toril (June 28, 2016 – April 29, 2017)
 Vicente Parras (April 29, 2017 – June 16, 2017)
 Vicente Mir (June 16, 2017 – November 13, 2017)
 José Acciari (November 13, 2017 – November 21, 2017)
 Josico (November 21, 2017 – February 27, 2018)
 Pacheta (February 27, 2018 – August 26, 2020)
 Jorge Almirón (August 26, 2020 – February 12, 2021)
 Fran Escribá (February 14, 2021 – November 21, 2021)

Reserve team
Elche's reserve team, Elche Ilicitano, was founded in 1932. It managed to spend two seasons in the second division, when the main squad was in the top flight.

Kit suppliers and shirt sponsors

See also
Trofeo Festa d'Elx

References

External links

Official website 
Futbolme team profile 
BDFutbol team profile

 
Football clubs in the Valencian Community
La Liga clubs
Association football clubs established in 1923
1923 establishments in Spain
Segunda División clubs